The Alfred Fagon Award  is granted annually for the best new play by a Black British playwright of Caribbean or African descent, resident in the United Kingdom. It was instituted in 1996 and first awarded in 1997, to recognise the work of Black British playwrights from the Caribbean, and named in honour of the poet and playwright, Alfred Fagon.  Its scope was broadened in 2006, to include those of African descent. The award is given with the support of the Peggy Ramsay Foundation.

Winners 
Past winners include:
 
 
 
 
 
 
 
 
 
 
 
 
  
 

 
 
 
 

 
 
 2019: Jasmine Lee-Jones, for seven methods of killing kylie jenner
 2020: Juliet Gilkes Romero, for The Whip
 2021: Mojisola Adebayo, for Family Tree

Other awards 

In 2014, additional awards were instigated, including one for the "outstanding contribution to writing" and an "audience award".

References

External links 

 

Dramatist and playwright awards
Black British culture
Theatre in the United Kingdom
Black theatre
Awards established in 1996
1996 establishments in the United Kingdom